Horst Widmann (born 8 August 1938 in Leoben, Austria) is an Austrian painter.

Between 1959 and 1963, he studied art in Linz, Austria.  Since 1964, he has lived and worked in Paris.  A part of his work, since 1982, is based on X-rays.

Exhibitions 
 2013 - FRED TORRES COLLABORATIONS "Mon Ami" - We Share the Same Sky. New York (USA).
 2011 - BALT'ART - Art and The "Grand Paris" at "Pavillon Baltard".
 2010 - TRANSVERSALITE, Saint-Jean-de-Monts.
 2010 - COP'ART in Lorraine.
 2009 - F.A.E gallery, Boulogne.
 2009 - JBS gallery, Paris.
 2009 - Gallery Villa, Paris.
 2008 - MACparis, Manifestation of Contemporary Art in Paris.
 2005 - 50e Salon d'art contemporain de Montrouge
 1992 - Bibliothèque nationale de France, “De Bonnard à Baselitz”.

Notes and references 
 in "Artension" - N°107 p. 16/17. (May–June 2010). COP'ART : l'art entre dans les entreprises.
 in "Art scènes" - N°21 p. 14/15. (September 2009).
 in "Connaissance des Arts" - N°665 événements, p. 20. (November 2008).

External links 
Horst Widmann Website
Horst Widmann Gallery

Austrian contemporary artists
20th-century Austrian painters
Austrian male painters
21st-century Austrian painters
21st-century male artists
1938 births
Living people
20th-century Austrian male artists